Iconicles is a live-action/animated television series for pre-schoolers. The series is a co-production between the British Create Media Ventures and the American phuuz entertainment, in association with Foothill Entertainment and Dinamo Productions. The series uses a cross between live-action, flash animation and CGI animation.

Plot 
The series tells of a man named Nat (Gavin Stenhouse) who invents an amazing display, the Iconi-Screen, that allows him to communicate with animated animals in various settings, such as a farm, the sea, a jungle, and a forest. The animals are called "Iconicles". In every episode Nat has a problem and is helped to solve it by an Iconicle, who jumps out of the Iconi-Screen to enter the real world and interact with Nat. At some point in every episode, there is a game with questions and answers based on what happened with some of the Iconicles.

Characters 
The most prominent Iconicles:

 Rumple (voiced by Toby Williams): a grumpy rhino who has a big heart for other Iconicles.
 Miss Moo (voiced by Helen Lederer); a cow who has strict rules to keep everything tidy yet is very humble.
 Splish and Splash (voiced by Sam Lewis and Ellie Jayne Howick): Two twin polar bear cubs who are curious and always want to have a lot of fun.
 Skitter (voiced by Tim Dann): a friendly squirrel who loves to collect acorns.

Development
The show's development began as early as September 2005, and was announced to be in production by March 2006. when Foothill and Create Media Ventures announced development deals with Phuuz Entertainment for the production of the series.

In April 2007, CBeebies announced they had greenlit the series with plans for it to broadcast within a Fall 2008 delivery window. BBC Worldwide were also once involved in the production of the series.

The series never got past this window, and more information about the show was announced by CBeebies on November 25, 2008, with the intention of the series being broadcast within the 2009 schedule. Once again, the series never aired during this window.

In March 2010, Beyond Distribution acquired distribution rights to the series.

In May 2011, production of the series was announced to be almost complete. The series would premiere on CBeebies on September 5, 2011.

Broadcast
On February 23, 2012, Discovery Kids, TVOntario and Discovery Familia acquired the Latin American, Canadian and Hispanic American broadcast rights to the series.

Episodes

References

CBeebies
British preschool education television series
British television series with live action and animation
2011 British television series debuts
2011 British television series endings
2010s British children's television series
American preschool education television series
American television series with live action and animation
2011 American television series debuts
2011 American television series endings
2010s American children's television series
2010s preschool education television series
English-language television shows